The 2020–21 season was the 128th season in existence of SBV Vitesse and the club's 31st consecutive season in the top flight of Dutch football. In addition to the domestic league, Vitesse participated in this season's edition of the KNVB Cup. The season covered the period from 1 July 2020 to 30 June 2021.

Players

First-team squad

Players out on loan

Transfers

In

Out

Pre-season and friendlies

Competitions

Overview

Eredivisie

League table

Results summary

Results by round

Matches
The league fixtures were announced on 24 July 2020.

KNVB Cup

Statistics

Goalscorers

References

External links

SBV Vitesse seasons
SBV Vitesse